The Blade Itself is a 2007 crime thriller novel by Marcus Sakey.

Plot summary
The novel, set in Chicago, is the story of two childhood friends and young criminals, Danny Carter and Evan McGann.  Years after their criminal partnership dissolved, just as Carter has reformed himself and started a respectable new life, his former partner soon returns from prison to threaten Carter's peaceful new existence with demands of re-teaming.

Reception
The Blade Itself was selected as a New York Times Editor's Pick and named one of Esquire Magazine's 5 Best Reads of 2007.

Adaptations
Director and actor Ben Affleck bought the film rights to the novel in 2008 for his production company.

References

2007 American novels
Novels set in Chicago